Robert Kenneth Loane (August 5, 1914 – December 11, 2002) was a Major League Baseball player. He played two seasons with the Washington Senators (1939) and Boston Bees (1940).

References

External links

Major League Baseball outfielders
Boston Bees players
Washington Senators (1901–1960) players
Oakland Oaks (baseball) players
Portland Beavers players
Los Angeles Angels (minor league) players
Chattanooga Lookouts players
Council Bluffs Rails players
Albany Senators players
Trenton Senators players
Syracuse Chiefs players
Waterloo Red Hawks players
Durham Bulls players
Springfield Nationals players
Hartford Bees players
Baseball players from Berkeley, California
1914 births
2002 deaths